Wakeman Township is one of the nineteen townships of Huron County, Ohio, United States. As of the 2010 census the population of the township was 2,731, up from 2,528 at the 2000 census. As of 2010, 1,684 of the population lived in the unincorporated portion of the township.

Geography
Located in the northeastern corner of the county, it borders the following townships:
Florence Township, Erie County - north
Henrietta Township, Lorain County - northeast
Camden Township, Lorain County - east
Clarksfield Township - south
Hartland Township - southwest corner
Townsend Township - west
Berlin Township, Erie County - northwest corner

The village of Wakeman is located in central Wakeman Township.

Name and history
Wakeman Township was organized in 1824. It was named for Jesup Wakeman, one of the first landowners there.

It is the only Wakeman Township statewide.

Government
The township is governed by a three-member board of trustees, who are elected in November of odd-numbered years to a four-year term beginning on the following January 1. Two are elected in the year after the presidential election and one is elected in the year before it. There is also an elected township fiscal officer, who serves a four-year term beginning on April 1 of the year after the election, which is held in November of the year before the presidential election. Vacancies in the fiscal officership or on the board of trustees are filled by the remaining trustees.

References

External links
County website

Townships in Huron County, Ohio
Townships in Ohio